Austin Ainge (born September 29, 1981) is an American basketball coach, executive, and former collegiate player. He is the current director of player personnel for the Boston Celtics of the National Basketball Association (NBA).

Playing career
Ainge attended Highland High School in Gilbert, Arizona, where he averaged 22 points, 5 rebounds, and 4 assists as a senior. He was named Fiesta Conference First Team, Conference MVP, East Valley Region First Team, and East Valley MVP.

Ainge had a successful basketball career at Brigham Young University where, as a two-time team captain, he led the school to two Mountain West Conference championships, three NCAA tournaments and one NIT appearance. Ainge was named All-Conference Honorable Mention twice. During the 2006–07 season, he led the MWC in three-point field goal percentage at 52.5% and was one of the best three-point shooters in the nation.

Coaching career
On July 21, 2009, he was named the first head coach of the Maine Red Claws, an expansion team in the NBA Development League.

In May 2011, Ainge was named Director of Player Personnel for the Boston Celtics. Previously, Ainge performed scouting duties for the Celtics organization. As a part of this position, he worked with Celtics rookies J.R. Giddens and Bill Walker while they were on assignment with the Utah Flash of the NBA Development League.

Prior to joining the Celtics front office staff, Ainge served a stint as an assistant coach for Southern Utah University, where he was responsible for perimeter players, recruiting, player development, video breakdown, and developing game plans.  There, he worked under former Phoenix Suns assistant and BYU coach Roger Reid.

Personal life
Austin is the son of former Boston Celtics player and former Boston Celtics President of Basketball Operations, Danny Ainge. Ainge and his wife, Crystal (née Bluth), have three children: Andre, Finley, and Otto.

References

External links
 
 Ainge bio at ESPN.com

1981 births
Living people
American men's basketball coaches
American men's basketball players
Basketball coaches from Arizona
Basketball players from Arizona
Boston Celtics scouts
BYU Cougars men's basketball players
Maine Red Claws coaches
People from Gilbert, Arizona
Point guards
Southern Utah Thunderbirds men's basketball coaches
Sportspeople from the Phoenix metropolitan area